Neil Frederick Sachse (3 January 1951 – 25 August 2020) was a South Australian National Football League (SANFL) and Victorian Football League (VFL) Australian rules footballer, who was left a quadriplegic after an on-field accident in a 1975 VFL game.

Footscray career

Sachse was a premiership player with North Adelaide before moving to VFL club Footscray in 1975.

In his second match for Footscray (Round 2, 1975), Sachse was left a quadriplegic after an accidental collision with Fitzroy player, Kevin O'Keeffe. He was left with no use of his legs, and little movement in his hands. However he could still move his arms and breathe normally.

The Neil Sachse Foundation
In 1994, Neil Sachse and Dawn Ferrett founded an organisation to raise funds for research into the treatment of spinal cord injury. Originally known as the Spinal Research Fund of Australia Incorporated, it was renamed the Neil Sachse Foundation.

Since 1994, it has raised over $2 million which has funded a research project at Flinders University that proved that nerve fibres in the spine can regenerate past the site of the injury and return some function.

In 2009, in recognition of his tireless work and dedication, Neil was awarded the "Premier's Award for Outstanding Community Achievement in South Australia" at an Awards Ceremony run by the Australia Day Council of SA at Government House.

Sachse's biography, Playing On, written with Michael Sexton, was released through Affirm Press in August 2015.

Sachse died on 25 August 2020.

References

External links

 The Neil Sachse Foundation Website
 Quadriplegic footballer keeps up the fight, ABC, 29 June 2009

1951 births
2020 deaths
Australian rules footballers from South Australia
North Adelaide Football Club players
People with tetraplegia
Western Bulldogs players